The Estádio Raimundo Ribeiro de Souza, known as the Ribeirão, is a football stadium located in the city of Boa Vista, Roraima, Brazil. The stadium is owned by the Roraima state government and has a capacity of 3,000.

References

Boa Vista, Roraima
Ribeiro de Souza